President Airlines was an  airline based in Phnom Penh, Cambodia. It was privately owned and operated scheduled passenger flights from Phnom Penh to domestic destinations, as well as flights to Thailand, Republic of China and Hong Kong out of Phnom Penh International Airport.

History 
President Airlines was established in 1997 and began operations in October 1998. Initially, it operated one Fokker F28 aircraft carrying passengers and cargo from Phnom Penh to Siem Reap. President Airlines subsequently consolidated its domestic routes and opened international services. In 2002, the airline joined IATA, thus allowing IATA Travel Agents to issue tickets through their respective reservations systems.

President Airlines was shut down in 2007.

Destinations 
At closure, President Airlines operated the following services: 
Domestic: Phnom Penh, Ratanakiri and Siem Reap.
International: Bangkok.

Fleet 

The President Airlines fleet includes the following aircraft (at March 2007):
1 Antonov An-24RV.

Previously operated
Additionally, at August 2006 the airline operated:
1 x Fokker F27 Mk100
1 x Fokker 28 Mk1000

A Boeing 737-200 was delivered in March 2003 from Serbian carrier Aviogenex, but was disposed of again in October 2004.

References

External links

Official website (defunct)

Defunct airlines of Cambodia
Airlines established in 1997
Airlines disestablished in 2007
Cambodian companies established in 1997